Wreckers Must Breathe is a 1940 thriller novel by the British writer Hammond Innes. It was published in the United States by Putnam's under the title Trapped. Set in the early stages of the Second World War, it tells a story about German U-boats operating from a secret base in Cornwall. The title refers to the tradition of wrecking on the Cornish coast.

References

Bibliography
 James Vinson & D. L. Kirkpatrick. Contemporary Novelists. St. James Press, 1986.
 Duncan Redford. The Submarine: A Cultural History from the Great War to Nuclear Combat. I.B.Tauris, 2015.

1940 British novels
Novels by Hammond Innes
British thriller novels
Novels set in Cornwall
William Collins, Sons books